Emmalocera eremochroa is a species of snout moth in the genus Emmalocera. It is found in the Australian state of Western Australia.

References

Moths described in 1918
Emmalocera